Miss Marple is a series of full cast BBC Radio drama adaptations of Agatha Christie's Miss Marple stories. The original series consisted of adaptations of all twelve Miss Marple novels, dramatised by Michael Bakewell and directed by Enyd Williams. They were broadcast on BBC Radio 4 between 1993 and 2001 and starred June Whitfield as Miss Marple.

Subsequently, adaptations of three Miss Marple short stories (again starring Whitfield) were broadcast under the collective title Miss Marple's Final Cases weekly 16–30 September 2015. These were adapted by Joy Wilkinson and directed by Gemma Jenkins.

List of adaptations

See also
Hercule Poirot (radio series)
Lord Peter Wimsey (radio series)
Sherlock Holmes (1989 radio series)

References

External links

Miss Marple
BBC Radio 4 programmes
Lists of radio series episodes
Detective radio shows